Jaidev Rai was the Governor of Brahmachal under the Twipra Kingdom.

Life
Jaidev Rai was a son of the minister of Brahmachal - a kingdom in southern Sylhet ruled by Raja Upananda. The long-lasted conflict between northern Gour Kingdom and southern Brahmachal, continued to trouble the land. Raja Govardhan of Gour, wanted to infiltrate Brahmachal. The King was able to lure Upananda's general, Amar Singh and persuade the Kuki Chiefs, the border guards for the Tripura Kingdom just south of Brahmachal into raiding Raja Upananda's palace in the dead of the night. The plan was successful; the Kukis massacred most of the palace's inmates. A battle emerged leading to the death of Raja Upananda. General Amar Singh took control of Brahmachal for a short while before also being killed in the battle. The Kuki Chiefs eventually annexed Brahmachal (centred in modern-day Baramchal in Kulaura) to the King of Tripura.

With the death of Singh, Govardhan appointed Rai to be a feudal ruler under the Tripuras to which he accepted. Amar Singh's wife, Chandra Kala, was left pregnant without her husband to look after her and her child, and was put in the care of Jaidev Rai.

Rai's office ended in 1260 with the ascension of Raja Gour Govinda to the throne. Govinda made peace with King Ratan Manikya of Tripura, by gifting him an elephant as a plea for the King to give Brahmachal (Southern Sylhet) back to him off Jaidev Rai, to which the King accepted.

References

Rulers of Sylhet
13th-century Indian people
13th-century rulers in Asia
Indian Hindus